Congo Square is the thirteenth studio album by American singer and songwriter Teena Marie. Released in the United States on June 9, 2009, it would be her only album for the revived Stax label and the final album released before her death in late December 2010.

Congo Square peaked at #4 on the US R&B Albums chart and #20 on the Billboard 200. Lead single "Can't Last a Day", a duet with Faith Evans, peaked at #41 on the US R&B singles chart, followed by "You Baby". The album features collaborations with Teena Marie's daughter Alia Rose—who records under the name of Rose LeBeau—and rapper MC Lyte, as well as Faith Evans, George Duke and Shirley Murdock.

Background 
The album title references Congo Square, in the Tremé in New Orleans, an area in which, during times of slavery, slaves were "allowed to dance and sing in the wardrobe of their mother country on Sundays." Teena Marie said of the album:

"I've been through quite a few trials and tribulations over the last two years. I spent many of those hours in prayer and felt like God was putting his arms around me. I started thinking about the music I grew up on—how inspired it was. Each song I was coming up with began to sound like the style of some favorite artist of mine from the past... Curtis Mayfield and Marvin Gaye, Billie Holliday, the old Chicago soul of The Emotions and the new Chicago vibe of Kanye West... Ice Cube's bumpin' in the trunk vibe and of course, Rick James. It's all in there."

Teena Marie also expressed her appreciation for Faith Evans, saying, "I've always loved Faith and her vocal style. She reminds me of me. Her correlation with Biggie—having a career with him and without him—reminds me of me and Rick [James]. I feel like she's a younger me. Of the younger ladies, she's the one I love most."

Track listing 
All songs written by Teena Marie, except where noted.

 "The Pressure" (featuring MC Lyte) (Marie, James Allen, Doug Grigsby) – 5:32
 "Can't Last a Day" (featuring Faith Evans) – 5:05
 "Baby I Love You" (Marie, Nairobi Williams) – 4:57
 "Ear Candy 101" – 4:48 (Ben Del Giorgio, Doug Grigsby)
 "Lover's Lane" (featuring Howard Hewett) – 5:07
 "Marry Me" – 5:31
 "You Baby" – 4:15
 "Milk N' Honey" (featuring Gail Gotti and Rose LeBeau) (Marie, Rose LeBeau) – 5:26
 "What U Got 4 Me" (Marie, Allen) – 4:42
 "Rovleta's Jass" – 0:31
 "Congo Square" (featuring George Duke) – 4:55
 "Harlem Blues" – 5:17
 "Black Cool" – 1:59
 "Ms. Coretta" – 5:19
 "Soldier Boy" (featuring Shirley Murdock) – 4:25
 "The Rose N' Thorn" – 5:30

Charts

Weekly charts

Year-end charts

Singles

References

External links 
 Congo Square on Concord Music Group

2009 albums
Stax Records albums
Teena Marie albums